"Easy Love" may refer to:
"Easy Love" (Dionne Warwick song), 1980
"Easy Love" (Sigala song), 2015
"Easy Love" (Lauv song), 2017
"Easy Love", a song by R5 on the 2014 EP Heart Made Up on You
"Easy Love", a 2019 song by Blair St. Clair
"Easy Love", a 2015 song by James Morrison from Higher Than Here

See also
"Easy Lover", a 1984 song by Philip Bailey and Phil Collins
Easy to Love (disambiguation)